FNQ Rugby, formerly the Cairns and District Rugby Union (CDRU), is the umbrella organisation for Rugby Union in Cairns and Far North Queensland.

They are an affiliated sub-union of the Queensland Rugby Union and ultimately the Australian Rugby Union and are run by 11 member clubs spread across the region from Innisfail to the South, Port Douglas and surrounds to the North and west to the Tablelands.

FNQ Rugby runs senior men’s, women’s and junior rugby competitions.

Clubs
 Barron Trinity Bulls
 Brothers Rugby Union
 Cairns Old Crocs
 Cairns RSL Wanderers
 Innisfail Vikings
 JCU Mariners
 Port Douglas Raiders
 Southside Crusaders Sport
 Tablelands Highlanders
 Penrhyn Sharks
 Cairns Northern Beaches Rugby Union

See also

 Rugby union in Queensland

References

External links
 
 

Rugby union governing bodies in Queensland
Far North Queensland
Sport in Cairns